Bo Gunge  (born 22 April 1964 in Copenhagen) is a Danish composer.

See also
List of Danish composers

References

20th-century Danish composers
Male composers
1964 births
Living people
Musicians from Copenhagen
21st-century Danish composers